STS-44 was a NASA Space Shuttle mission using Atlantis that launched on November 24, 1991. It was a U.S. Department of Defense (DoD) space mission.

Crew

Backup crew

Crew seating arrangements

Mission highlights 
The launch was on November 24, 1991, at 23:44:00 UTC. A launch set for November 19, 1991, was delayed due to replacement and testing of a malfunctioning redundant inertial measurement unit on the Inertial Upper Stage (IUS) booster attached to the Defense Support Program (DSP) satellite. The launch was reset for November 24 and was delayed by 13 minutes to allow an orbiting spacecraft to pass and to allow external tank liquid oxygen replenishment after minor repairs to a valve in the liquid oxygen replenishment system in the mobile launcher platform.

The mission was dedicated to the Department of Defense. The unclassified payload included a Defense Support Program (DSP) satellite, DSP-16 attached to Inertial Upper Stage (IUS-14), deployed on flight day one. Cargo bay and middeck payloads included the Interim Operational Contamination Monitor (IOCM), Terra-Scout, Military Man in Space (M88-1), Air Force Maui Optical Site (AMOS), Cosmic Radiation Effects and Activation Monitor (CREAM), Shuttle Activation Monitor (SAM), Radiation Monitoring Equipment (RME III), Visual Function Tester (VFT-1), Ultraviolet Plume Instrument (UVPI), Bioreactor Flow, and Extended Duration Orbiter Medical Project, a series of investigations in support of Extended Duration Orbiter.

The landing was on December 1, 1991, at 22:34:44 UTC, Runway 5, Edwards Air Force Base, California. The landing was originally scheduled for Kennedy Space Center on December 4, 1991, but the ten-day mission was shortened and the landing rescheduled following the November 30, 1991, on-orbit failure of one of three orbiter inertial measurement units. The lengthy rollout was due to minimal braking for test. Atlantis returned to Kennedy on December 8, 1991. This was also the final shuttle landing on a dry lake bed runway.

Wake-up calls 
NASA began a tradition of playing music to astronauts during the Project Gemini, and first used music to wake up a flight crew during Apollo 15. Each track is specially chosen, often by the astronauts' families, and usually has a special meaning to an individual member of the crew, or is applicable to their daily activities.

See also 

 List of human spaceflights
 List of Space Shuttle missions
 Nikon NASA F4
 Outline of space science

References

External links 
 NASA mission summary 
 STS-44 Video Highlights 

Space Shuttle missions
Edwards Air Force Base
Spacecraft launched in 1991
Department of Defense Space Shuttle missions